NGC 148 (also known as PGC 2035) is a lenticular galaxy located in the constellation Sculptor. It is about 40,000 light years across. It is in a group of three galaxies along with MCG-5-2-16 and IC 1555. It is a Shapley-Ames galaxy.

References

External links
 

Sculptor (constellation)
Lenticular galaxies
0148
002035